The Roman Catholic Diocese of Pesqueira is a diocese located in the city of Pesqueira in the Ecclesiastical province of Olinda e Recife in Brazil.

History
 December 5, 1910: Established as Diocese of Floresta from the Diocese of Olinda
 August 2, 1918: Renamed as Diocese of Pesqueira

Bishops

Ordinaries, in reverse chronological order
 Bishops of Pesqueira (Roman rite), below
 Bishop José Luiz Ferreira Salles, C.Ss.R. (since 2012.02.15)
 Bishop Francesco Biasin (2003.07.23 – 2011.06.08), appointed Bishop of Barra do Piraí–Volta Redonda)
 Bishop Bernardino Marchió (1993.05.26 – 2002.11.06), appointed Bishop of Caruaru, Pernambuco 
 Bishop Manuel Palmeira da Rocha (1980.03.14 – 1993.05.26)
 Bishop Severino Mariano de Aguiar (1956.12.03 – 1980.03.14)
 Bishop Adelmo Cavalcante Machado (1948.04.03 – 1955.06.24), appointed Coadjutor Archbishop of Maceió, Alagoas
 Bishop Adalberto Accioli Sobral (1934.01.13 – 1947.01.18), appointed Archbishop of São Luís do Maranhão
 Bishop José Antônio de Oliveira Lopes (1918.08.02 – 1932.11.24)
 Bishops of Floresta (Roman Rite), below
 Bishop José Antônio de Oliveira Lopes (1915.06.26 – 1918.08.02)
 Bishop Augusto Álvaro da Silva (1911.05.12 – 1915.06.25), appointed Bishop of Barra (do Rio Grande), Bahia; future Archbishop and Cardinal

Coadjutor bishop
Bernardino Marchió (1991-1993)

See also 

 Cimbres Marian apparition, which happened in the diocese in 1936 and 1937.

References
 GCatholic.org
 Catholic Hierarchy

Roman Catholic dioceses in Brazil
Christian organizations established in 1910
Pesqueira, Roman Catholic Diocese of
Roman Catholic dioceses and prelatures established in the 20th century